The University of Toliara is historically the oldest center for higher education, founded in 1971 after the decentralization of the University of Madagascar center. The university campus is located in Maninday 5 km east of the city of Toliara, the capital of Atsimo-Andrefana on the southwest side of Madagascar. This university teaches Humanities and Social Science, Science, Philosophy, and Management (the latter located next to the Cedratom).

The university operates the CEDRATOM Museum.

Faculties and Institutions 
 Ecole Normale Superieur (ENS)
 Insitut Superieur Technologique (IST)
 IHSM
 Faculte de Lettres 
 Faculte de Biologie

Notable alumni 
 Samoela Jaona Ranarivelo, Anglican Bishop of Antananarivo

References

External links 
 [
 UniToliara.info online learning platform project

Universities in Madagascar
1971 establishments in Madagascar